Evernic acid is an organic compound with the molecular formula C17H16O7. Evernic acid was first isolated from the lichen Usnea longissima. Evernic acid is soluble in hot alcohol and bad soluble in water. Evernic acid is produced by the lichens Ramalina, Evernia, and Hypogymnia.

References

Further reading 

 
 
 +
 
 
 
 
 
 
 
 
 

Polyphenols
Methoxy compounds
Esters
Carboxylic acids